Kamnaskires II, surnamed Nikephoros ("the Bringer of Victory") was a king of the Elymais only known from his coins. He reigned from about 147 to 139 BC. Around 150 BC, the Seleucid empire disintegrated and at several places local governors became independent and assumed the title of "king" (basileus). The first king in the Elymais was Kamnaskires Soter ("the Saviour"), who ruled around 147 BC. Kamnaskires II Nikephoros ruled slightly later and it is possible that he was identical with Kamnaskires Soter, just changing his name. In 140 BC, Kamnaskires II accepted Parthian suzerainty. However, not long after, Kamnaskires II aided the Seleucid ruler Demetrius II Nicator against the Parthian monarch Mithridates I. However, Demetrius was eventually defeated and captured by the Parthians. Mithridates I then punished Elymais for aiding the Seleucids–he invaded the region once more and captured two of their major cities.

The coins of Kamnaskires II Nikephoros are fully Hellenistic in style. They show the portrait of a young man. The reverse shows most often a young god. Less common are an anchor, a cornucopia, an eagle, a bow with quiver or a Nike.

References

Sources 
 
 
 
 
 
 

2nd-century BC rulers in Asia
Kings of Elymais